Marumi (written: , ,  or  in hiragana) is a feminine Japanese given name. Notable people with the name include:

, Japanese television personality and gravure idol
, Japanese actress
, Japanese women's footballer

Japanese feminine given names